The 2005 Carroll Fighting Saints football team was an American football team that represented Carroll College as a member of the Frontier Conference during the 2005 NAIA football season. In their seventh season under head coach Mike Van Diest, the Saints compiled a perfect 14–0 record (8–0 against conference opponents) and won the NAIA national championship, defeating Saint Francis (Indiana), 27–10, in the NAIA National Championship Game.

The team was led on offense by junior quarterback Tyler Emmert. Emmert received the NAIA Football Player of the Year Award in both 2003 and 2005.

The team played its home games at Nelson Stadium in Helena, Montana.

Schedule

References

Carroll
Carroll Fighting Saints football seasons
NAIA Football National Champions
College football undefeated seasons
Carroll Fighting Saints football